Christian Science Society may refer to:

 Christian Science Society (Nanaimo), British Columbia, Canada
 Christian Science Society (Steamboat Springs, Colorado)
 Christian Science Society (Grinnell, Iowa)
 Christian Science Society (Cape May, New Jersey)
  Christian Science Society (Oconto, Wisconsin)